Hotels.com is a website for booking hotel rooms online and by telephone. The company has 85 websites in 34 languages, and lists over 325,000 hotels in approximately 19,000 locations. Its inventory includes hotels and B&Bs, and some condos and other types of commercial lodging. Hotels.com was established in 1991 as the Hotel Reservations Network (HRN). In 2001, it became part of Expedia, Inc. and in 2002, changed its name to Hotels.com. The company is operated by Hotels.com LP, a limited partnership subsidiary located in Dallas, Texas, in the United States.

History

Hotels.com was established in 1991 by David Litman and Robert Diener as the Hotel Reservations Network (HRN), providing hotel booking via a toll-free phone number in the United States. In 2001, the company was acquired by USA Networks Inc (USAI) which also acquired a controlling interest in Expedia, the online travel booking company.

After buying the domain name for approximately US$11m, HRN changed its name in 2002 to Hotels.com and launched the offline brand 1-800-2-Hotels as well as allowing hotel bookings on line. There followed a period of rapid international expansion with 29 sites added over the next two years. In 2003, USAI was renamed InterActiveCorp (IAC). In 2005 IAC separated its travel business under the name Expedia Inc.  Hotels.com then became an operating company of Expedia Inc.

International growth since 2002 has included web sites for North, Central and South America, Europe, Australia, Japan, China and the Pacific Rim, the Middle East and South Africa. Web sites for Indonesia and Vietnam launched in 2011. Customers in all countries can book online or by phoning one of the multilingual call centres. Calls are both toll-free and paid, depending on the country of booking.

In 2011, the site launched an iPad application and updated its mobile phone product on iPhone and Android.

On December 1, 2016, Hotels.com took over Venere.com (another Expedia owned company).

U.S. disability rights infringement

In May 2007, Hotels.com was subject to a class action complaint (Smith v. Hotels.com L.P., California Superior Court, Alameda County, Case No. RG07327029) brought against them for “ongoing discrimination against persons with mobility disabilities who desire to, but cannot, use Hotels.com’s worldwide reservation network to make reservations for hotel rooms”.  The company denied the accusation and opposed the action, but was found guilty on one count of infringing California's Unruh Civil Rights Act, and on one count in violation of Unfair Competition Law. It was agreed that the company would provide suitable accessibility information about hotels sold on its website.

Privacy concerns

In February 2019, TechCrunch reported that the Hotels.com mobile app in the iOS App Store was using session-replay functionality from Israeli firm Glassbox, to record users' activities and send the data to Expedia servers without users' informed consent, compromising users' privacy and contravening the rules of the iOS App Store.

Loyalty program
Like its competitors (such as Agoda), Hotels.com has a loyalty program.  This allows customers to claim discounts on most, but not all, hotels, regardless of hotel chain or type. The program is called "Hotels.com Rewards" (formerly "Welcome Rewards") and launched in the US, Canada and much of Latin America in 2008. It then extended to the UK and Australia in 2010, and to more than 40 additional countries in 2011.

Hotel Price Index
Starting 2004, the site has published a twice-yearly review of international hotel room price trends called the Hotels.com Hotel Price Index based on the prices paid per room by its customers using a weighted average based on the number of rooms sold in each of the markets in which it operates. Information includes notable price changes and comparisons between destinations, hotel types, and other price-related analyses for the previous six months. The Hotel Price Index is published both digitally and in print, and is aimed at journalists, the media, and hoteliers as part of its public relations.

Advertising

Ed Helms voiced the character "Smart" in Hotels.com advertisements. In 2012, the character was changed from clay animation to CGI.  The company's advertising slogan was originally "Smart. So Smart" before being changed to "Be Smart. Book Smart".

In 2014, the site introduced the character "Captain Obvious" who is portrayed by actor Brandon Moynihan. Captain Obvious makes self-evident comments with the aim of communicating that Hotels.com is the obvious choice. The campaign was devised by the ad firm Crispin Porter + Bogusky. Moynihan said in an interview "Hotels.com has a great self awareness and they're not afraid to push the envelope with the crazy stuff I get to do as Captain Obvious". Notable advertisements include one where he runs for president, a La La Land inspired ad and an ad where Captain Obvious meets his future self. In 2018, Captain Obvious featured in Channel 4's  ad blocking campaign. In 2019, Captain Obvious appeared as a DJ in an episode of Four Weddings and a Funeral.

The character has since entered popular culture. In one such example, during a 2018 interview at State College, Pennsylvania, famed lesbian feminist philosopher Marilyn Frye pointed to the time that she personally edited her own Wikipedia page in July 2011. Frye admitted that she removed an entire paragraph. The paragraph claimed that she compared the alleged misogyny and theatrical mockery of women in the works of C. S. Lewis to underground male prostitution rings in her published works. Frye quipped, "While what was said could easily be extrapolated from my work, I have never written a word linking C. S. Lewis to male prostitution before. I am not Captain Obvious from Hotels.com!" 

Starting in the 2018-19 season, Hotels.com became the official global sponsor of UEFA Champions League and the UEFA Super Cup along with Expedia.

See also 
 DDR Holdings v. Hotels.com
 
 
 {{Dailytravelbud}}

References

External links

Online travel agencies
American travel websites
American companies established in 1991
Hospitality companies established in 1991
Internet properties established in 1991
2001 mergers and acquisitions
Hospitality companies of the United States
Companies based in Dallas
1991 establishments in Texas

Expedia Group